Adzhimazhagatyurt (Ajimajahatyurt; , Ẋäƶ-Mjäƶ-Yurt) is a rural locality (a selo) in Khasavyurtovsky District, Republic of Dagestan, Russia. The population was 824 as of 2010. There are 21 streets.

Geography 
Adzhimazhagatyurt is located 15 km northwest of Khasavyurt (the district's administrative centre) by road. Batashyurt is the nearest rural locality.

References 

Rural localities in Khasavyurtovsky District